General elections were held in the Northern Territory of Australia on 9 August 2008. Of the 25 seats in the Legislative Assembly, 23 were contested; two safe Labor seats were uncontested. The incumbent centre-left Labor Party (ALP), led by Chief Minister Paul Henderson won a narrow third term victory against the opposition centre-right Country Liberal Party (CLP), led by Terry Mills. Labor suffered a massive and unexpected swing against it, to hold a one-seat majority in the new parliament.

Results

|}

Independents: Gerry Wood

Arnhem and MacDonnell were won by the ALP by default as no other candidates nominated, and therefore do not contribute to votes in the above result table. The Greens ran in six of the 25 seats, averaging around 16 percent. Minister for Natural Resources, Environment and Heritage, Minister for Parks and Wildlife Len Kiely was defeated as was Minister for Sport and Recreation, Corporate and Information Services Matthew Bonson.

Background
The CLP had dominated the Legislative Assembly from its creation in 1974 until 2001, when Clare Martin led Labor to government by one seat.  Four years later, Labor was reelected in a landslide that surprised even the most optimistic Labor observers, reducing the CLP to only four seats.  Labor even managed to oust Opposition Leader Denis Burke in his own seat.  Martin resigned in 2007, shortly after a federal intervention, and was succeeded by Education Minister Paul Henderson.

In January 2008, Opposition Leader Jodeen Carney faced a challenge from her deputy, Terry Mills.  Carney rebuffed a proposal to swap posts with Mills (in which she would have become deputy leader under Mills), instead calling a spill.  When the vote was tied, Carney declared that a tie vote was not a vote of confidence and resigned, leaving Mills to take the leadership unopposed.  Hoping to take advantage of a booming economy and the recent change in opposition leadership, Henderson opted to call an election a year before it was due.

The writs were dropped only days after the gazetting of new electoral boundaries.  The Electoral Commission didn't have nearly enough time to notify voters of their new electorates, and a number of Labor MPs swept into office on the back of the 2005 landslide were unable to connect with new constituents on the hustings.

The CLP regained much of what it had lost in its severe beating of three years prior.  Notably, it retook two seats in Palmerston that it had lost to Labor in the 2005 landslide.  While the CLP won a slim majority of the two-party vote (aided by two Labor incumbents being reelected unopposed), Labor retained all but one seat in northern Darwin, allowing it to win a third term.  Labor was only assured of reelection when it won Martin's old seat of Fannie Bay by a narrow 78 votes.

Key dates

 Issue of writ: 22 July
 Close of roll: 8pm 24 July
 Close of nominations: 12 noon 28 July
 Postal voting commences: 31 July
 Pre-poll voting commences: 4 August
 Polling Day: 9 August

Retiring members
The following members did not seek another term at the election.

Labor
 Clare Martin (Fannie Bay)
 Elliot McAdam (Barkly)
 Syd Stirling (Nhulunbuy)

Country Liberal
 Fay Miller (Katherine)

Independent

 Loraine Braham (Braitling)

Candidates

Sitting members are listed in bold. Successful candidates are highlighted in the relevant colour.

Seats changing hands

 Members listed in italics did not contest their seat at this election.
 *Braitling's second figure is CLP vs. Labor
 **Due to boundary changes, Drysdale and Goyder were notionally CLP at the time of this election. However, as they were held by members of the ALP at this time, they are still included in this table.

Electoral pendulum
The following pendulum is known as the Mackerras pendulum, invented by psephologist Malcolm Mackerras.  The pendulum works by lining up all of the seats held in the Legislative Assembly according to the percentage point margin they are held by on a two-party-preferred basis. This is also known as the swing required for the seat to change hands. Given a uniform swing to the opposition or government parties, the number of seats that change hands can be predicted.

Pre-election pendulum
Incumbent members who have become and remained an independent since the 2012 election are indicated in grey.

Members listed in italics did not re-contest their seat at the election.

Post-election pendulum

References

External links

Electoral sites
Northern Territory Electoral Commission website

Media sites
ABC NT Election website

Party sites
Australian Labor Party (NT) website
Country Liberal Party website
Northern Territory Greens website

Elections in the Northern Territory
2008 elections in Australia
2000s in the Northern Territory
August 2008 events in Australia